Sylwia Rynarzewska (born 14 June 1976) is a former professional tennis player from Poland.

Rynarzewska competed mostly on the ITF circuit, with her only WTA Tour main draw appearance coming in the doubles at the Polish Open in 1998.

As a member of Poland's Fed Cup team, Rynarzewska played doubles in two ties in 1998, against Great Britain and Greece.

ITF finals

Singles (0–4)

Doubles (0–1)

See also
List of Poland Fed Cup team representatives

References

External links
 
 
 

1976 births
Living people
Polish female tennis players
20th-century Polish women